Flabellum pavoninum is a species of deep sea coral belonging to the family Flabellidae. They are sometimes known as dentures of the sea because of the perceived resemblance of the corallum (skeleton) to a set of dentures.

Biology
Flabellum pavoninum is an azooxanthellate species of coral; this means that its tissues do not contain photosynthetic algae and it gains its nutrition solely from what it can catch with its tentacles from the surrounding water.

References

Flabellidae
Animals described in 1831